Ambroise Abdo (born 8 January 1820 in Aleppo, Syria - died in 1876) was a bishop of the Melkite Greek Catholic Archeparchy of Jerusalem and Melkite Greek Catholic Archeparchy of Zahle and Forzol.

Life

He was appointed in 1860 as Apostolic Vicar of Jerusalem and, on 1 April 1860, ordained bishop by Melkite Patriarch of Antioch, Clement Bahouth. His co-consecrators were Gregory Atta, Archeparch of Homs and Eparch Jacques Heliani, from Damascus. In 1864 he was appointed Patriarchal Vicar to Egypt and Sudan. On 15 November 1866 Abdo was appointed bishop of the Melkite Greek Catholic Archeparchy of Zahle and Forzol.

In 1869-1870 Abdo participated in the First Vatican Council in Rome. On 24 December 1875, he was again appointed as Apostolic Vicar of Jerusalem, a position he would hold until his death in 1876.

External links
 http://www.catholic-hierarchy.org/bishop/babdo.html

1820 births
1896 deaths
People from Aleppo
Melkite Greek Catholic bishops
Syrian Melkite Greek Catholics
Participants in the First Vatican Council